Anna Kael (2 February 1908 – 24 February 1985) was a Hungarian all-round sportswoman and university professor. She competed successfully in athletics, basketball and gymnastics.

Teaching career
Subsequently, she remained at the college and worked first as instructor and assistant professor beside Ottó Misángyi (1929–38), and later as full professor (1938–1950). Kael was a docent of the institution from 1950 until her retirement in 1964, including a period between 1950 and 1952 when she served as the head of the Faculty of Athletics.

Sports career
Kael competed for Testnevelési Főiskola SE (TFSE), the sports club of the college during her whole career, that spanned over one and a half decade (1926–1944). Like most of the Hungarian sportswomen of her time, she started with gymnastics; she was part of the Hungarian team that finished fourth at the 1928 Summer Olympics in the women's team event. At the 1934 World Artistic Gymnastics Championships she won the silver medal in women's team final, and finished fourth in the individual all-around.

With the introduction of women's events to the Hungarian Athletics Championships program in 1932, Kael also changed her focus on athletics. She competed in a wide variety of disciplines, winning a total of 8 individual national titles. At the 1932 Hungarian Athletics Championships she won both in the high jump and the long jump, thus becoming the first ever Hungarian champion in these events; in 1936 she won the long jump again. Additionally, she won five titles in the discus throw (1934, 1936, 1937, 1939, 1944).

Kael also showed talent in basketball and was a member of the TFSE team that won the inaugural Hungarian basketball championship in 1933. She repeated this success in 1939 and 1942.

Personal life
Kael married to Lajos Balogh, a fellow athlete, coach and engineer. They had one daughter, Anikó Balogh, who also became and athlete and competed in the javelin throw. Their grandsons, Attila Petőváry and Zsolt Petőváry are former Hungarian international water polo players.

References

1908 births
1985 deaths
Athletes from Budapest
Hungarian female high jumpers
Hungarian female javelin throwers
Hungarian female long jumpers
Hungarian female shot putters
Hungarian female sprinters
Hungarian women's basketball players
Hungarian female artistic gymnasts
Olympic gymnasts of Hungary
Gymnasts at the 1928 Summer Olympics
Medalists at the World Artistic Gymnastics Championships
Gymnasts from Budapest
Basketball players from Budapest